Albanel may refer to:

Albanel, Quebec, Canada
Lake Albanel, lake in Quebec, Canada

People with the surname
Charles Albanel (1616–1696), French missionary explorer in Canada and Jesuit priest
Christine Albanel (born 1955), French civil servant and politician